The fourteenth season of Let's Dance started on February 26, 2021 with the launch show on RTL, with the first regular show starting on March 5, 2021. Daniel Hartwich and Victoria Swarovski returned as hosts. Joachim Llambi, Motsi Mabuse and Jorge Gonzalez returned as judges.

Like in the previous season during the launch show the 14 celebrities found out which professional dancer they will dance with for the next few weeks.

Dancing Stars 2021 were Rúrik Gíslason & Renata Lusin.

Couples
On January 16, 2021, RTL announced the 14 celebrities which will participate this season. Once again after Kerstin Ott in Season 12 a same-sex couple will participate with former Prince Charming Nicolas Puschmann. On February 11, 2021 the professional dancers of the season were announced.

After winning the Profi-Challenge in 2020 either Christina Luft or Christian Polanc will have the chance to choose their partner.

Scoring chart

Red numbers indicates the lowest score for each week.
Green numbers indicates the highest score for each week.
 indicates the couple eliminated that week.
 indicates the returning couple that finished in the bottom two.
 indicates the couple which was immune from elimination.
 indicates the couple that didn't perform due to personal reasons.
 indicates the couple that withdrew from the competition.
 indicates the couple was eliminated but later returned to the competition.
 indicates the winning couple.
 indicates the runner-up couple.
 indicates the third-place couple.

Averages 
This table only counts for dances scored on a traditional 30-points scale.

Highest and lowest scoring performances 
The best and worst performances in each dance according to the judges' marks are as follows:

Couples' highest and lowest scoring dances
According to the traditional 30-point scale.

Weekly scores and songs

Launch show
For the fifth time, there was a launch show in which each celebrity met their partner for the first time. This show aired on 26 February 2021. In this first live show the celebrities and the professional partners danced in groups and each celebrity was awarded points by the judges and the viewers. At the end of the show the couple with the highest combined points was granted immunity from the first elimination in the following week.

After Christina Luft and Christian Polanc won the Profi Challenge together the year before, one of them was allowed to choose their celebrity partner. Season 13 Champion Lili Paul-Roncalli drew the lot with Polanc' name. Afterwards Polanc chose Lola Weippert as his celebrity partner.

Key
 Celebrity won immunity from the first elimination

The Team dances

Week 1

Running order

Week 2

Running order

Week 3
Theme: The Year I was born
Running order

Week 4

Running order

Week 5
 Theme: Summer Party
 The show aired on April 9 because of the Easter holidays.

Running order

Week 6

Running order

Week 7
Theme: Love week
 Ilse did not dance this week due to an injury.
Running order

Week 8

Running order

Week 9
Theme: Magic Moments
 Ilse DeLange withdrew from the competition due to an injury. Nicolas Puschmann returned to the competition.

Running order

Week 10

Running order

Week 11: Semi-final
Running order

Week 12: Final
Theme: Judges' Choice, Favorite dance & Freestyle
Running order

Dance chart
 Highest scoring dance
 Lowest scoring dance
 Was not scored (encore performance in the finale)
 The pair did not perform this week

References

External links
Official website

Let's Dance (German TV series)
2021 German television seasons